Rectors of the Jagiellonian University – List of rectors of the Jagiellonian University, known also as the Cracow Academy, University of Cracow, and Szkoła Główna Koronna. The list begins in 1400 at the restoration of the university under Jadwiga of Poland and Władysław II Jagiełło.

Uniwersytet Krakowski / Akademia Krakowska

1400 – 1499

1500 – 1599

1600 – 1699

1700 – 1777

Szkoła Główna Koronna (1777-1795)

Szkoła Główna Krakowska (1795-1805) 
 1797-1805 – Stanisław Minocki

From 1805 to 1809 tied to the University of Lviv and Germanized.

Repolonized after Cracow joined the Duchy of Warsaw.

Jagiellonian University

1817 – 1899 

 1853-1860 – No rectors elected; the university was headed by Piotr Bartynowski.

1900 – 1999

od 2000

Notes

Bibliography 
 
 
 

 
Jagiellonian University
Rectors of universities in Poland